Bucheli is a village in Tumaco Municipality, Nariño Department in Colombia.

Climate
Bucheli has a tropical rainforest climate (Af) with heavy to very heavy rainfall year-round.

References

Populated places in the Nariño Department